Frank Y. Figgemeier   (April 22, 1873 – April 15, 1915), was a pitcher in Major League Baseball who played for the 1894 Philadelphia Phillies of the National League. He pitched in one game for the Phillies, a complete game start on September 25, 1894, where he allowed 10 earned runs and picked up the loss. He later played in the Western Association (1894–1896), Western League (1894, 1896–1898), Interstate League (1899–1900), Illinois–Indiana–Iowa League (1901), Western League (1901) and American Association (1902).

Figgemeier died in 1915 in his home town of St. Louis, Missouri due to his chronic alcoholism.

References

External links

1873 births
1915 deaths
19th-century baseball players
Baseball players from St. Louis
Columbus Buckeyes (minor league) players
Columbus Senators players
Davenport River Rats players
Des Moines Prohibitionists players
Des Moines Indians players
Major League Baseball pitchers
Milwaukee Brewers (minor league) players
Minneapolis Millers (baseball) players
New Castle Quakers players
Omaha Omahogs players
Peoria Distillers players
Philadelphia Phillies players
St. Joseph Saints players
Alcohol-related deaths in Missouri